Gianluca Barattolo (born 3 July 1978 in Naples) is an Italian rowing cox.
He is currently a federal rowing instructor at the Sabaudia National Nautical Center.

References

External links
 

1978 births
Living people
Italian male rowers
Coxswains (rowing)
Rowers from Naples
World Rowing Championships medalists for Italy